Elections for the Indian state of Jammu and Kashmir were held over June 1977, which are generally regarded as the first 'free and fair' elections in the state. 
Jammu & Kashmir National Conference, newly revived from the former Plebiscite Front, won an overwhelming majority and re-elected Sheikh Abdullah as the Chief Minister.

Background
After reaching the 1974 Indira-Sheikh accord, Sheikh Abdullah was elected as the Chief Minister of Jammu and Kashmir by the ruling Indian National Congress party in the state legislature (which had in fact been the original National Conference founded by Abdullah in 1930s but merged into Congress before the 1967 elections). Abdullah remained in power during the National Emergency imposed by Indira Gandhi in 1975. After the Emergency was lifted, the Janata Party came to power in the Centre in the 1977 general election.

Elections were called for the state Legislative Assembly in June 1977.  Sheikh Abdullah now revived the National Conference from the erstwhile Plebiscite Front. The National Conference and Congress met head-on as equals, the first time such an electoral contest occurred since the State's Accession in 1947. The Prime Minister Morarji Desai (of the Janata Party) took steps to strengthen security in the state and declared that any rigging would be severely punished. This had a 'salutary effect' in the political atmosphere in the state witnessing its first 'free and fair' election.

The revival of the National Conference was greeted with great enthusiasm in the Kashmir Valley. In the words of Kashmiri, "the entire valley was red with N. C. flags. Every house and every market stood decorated with bunting."

Results
The National Conference won the majority in the Assembly with 47 of the 76 seats. Whereas it won 40 of the 42 seats in the Kashmir Valley, it was able to win only 7 seats out of 32 in the Jammu province.

The Indian National Congress (former National Conference, which had been in power since the State's accession) was reduced to third place, winning 11 seats in Jammu and none in the Valley.

The Janata Party (which had incorporated the former Jammu Praja Parishad) won 13 seats, its best performance so far. In addition to 11 seats in Jammu, it won 2 seats in the Valley for the first time.

Also significant is the fact that Jamaat-e-Islami won only one seat, down from 5 seats in the previous Assembly.

Elected members

Government formation
Sheikh Abdullah was sworn in as the Chief Minister of the State following the election. Mirza Afzal Beg was sworn in as the Deputy Chief Minister of Jammu and Kashmir .

By the end of the 1970s, the seventy-year-old Sheikh Abdullah anointed his son Farooq Abdullah as his successor. Following Sheikh's death in 1982, Farooq Abdullah was appointed as the Chief Minister. The National Conference government completed a full five-year term.

Before his death, Sheikh Abdullah initiated a controversial 'Grant of Permit for Resettlement' bill in the State's Legislative Assembly. As per the bill, any state subject of Jammu and Kashmir before 14 May 1954 or any of his descendants could apply for resettlement in the State provided they swore allegiance to both the Indian Constitution and the Constitution of the State. The bill was passed by the Legislative Assembly after Sheikh's death, but it aroused fears among the Hindus of Jammu that Pakistani sympathizers and agents could cross into the State and create tensions. The Central government forced Farooq Abdullah to refer the bill to the Supreme Court of India where it has been put into cold storage.

Commentary
All the elections held in Jammu and Kashmir before 1977 were plagued with corrupt electoral practices. The elections of 1977 represented a 'democratic breakthrough', according to scholar Steve Widmalm. Politician Bhim Singh stated, 'Morarji Desai openly declared that anyone who would attempt to pursue some form of rigging would be severely punished, and this was quite effective'. The Congress party in the Central Government has therefore been regarded as an obstacle to the State's democratic functioning. The party regarded Jammu and Kashmir to be a sensitive border state, which was not 'ready for democracy'. Building Indian nationalism was considered far more important. Activist Balraj Puri has disagreed with the sentiment. In his view, democratic functioning was indeed a prerequisite to integration and national unity. As a result of the democratization process, he has asserted that there were ten years of peace with 'no fundamentalism, no secessionism, and no communalism'. JKLF's Amanullah Khan has also endorsed the assessment. The observers he sent to the Kashmir Valley during the early 1980s reported that the situation was not conducive to inciting a rebellion. Journalist Tavleen Singh who covered the subsequent Assembly election in 1983 asked people wherever she went whether they regarded the plebiscite as an issue. 'Almost everywhere the answer was an emphatic no. People said that the past was dead and they were participating in this election as Indians,' she recounted.

References

Bibliography
 
 
 
 
 

Jammu and Kashmir
1977
1977